Hüti is a village in Hiiumaa Parish, Hiiu County, Estonia, on the island of Hiiumaa. As of 2011 Census, the settlement's population was 0.

In 1628, the first glass factory in Estonia was established in Hüti. It was owned by the Swedish military commander and a great Hiiumaa's landowner Jacob De la Gardie. But it closed off in 1664.

The village is first mentioned in 1798 (Hütti). Historically, the village was part of Kõrgessaare Manor, and Lauka Manor.

Gallery

References

Villages in Hiiu County
Former villages